East Knapton is a village in the Ryedale district of North Yorkshire, England. Until 1974 the village lay in the historic county boundaries of the East Riding of Yorkshire.

Geography
It is just north of the A64 near the junction with the B1258. The York to Scarborough railway line is just north of the village and runs close to the power station. From 1845 until 1930, there was a railway station. The village is in the Rillington ward of Ryedale District Council which has a combined population of 1,734. On the other side of the A64 is Knapton Wood.

History
The village lies in the parish of West Heslerton which has the All Saints church. This is part of the Rillington group of churches.

Knapton Generating Station

This power station was opened in 1995 by Amy Glover, 8 years old. It has a 42 MWe General Electric LM6000 open cycle gas turbine with a thermal efficiency of 38%. The development was the subject of a public inquiry in 1992, formal consent was given by the Department of Trade and Industry and the Department of the Environment in March 1993. In August 2006, Scottish Power sold the power station to the RGS Energy Ltd, a subsidiary of UK Energy Systems Ltd (a holding company owned by US Energy Systems of Avon, Connecticut) for £15.5 million. The plant uses about 12,000 BTU per kWh of electricity, which is inefficient to more modern CCGT plants which use about 6,500 BTU per kWh of electricity.

Natural gas was discovered in Ryedale in 1970. The gas for the power station does not come from the National Transmission System but local gas fields found in Permian limestone and carboniferous sandstone at 5,000-foot depth. The Permian reservoir gas contains small quantities of hydrogen sulphide (less than 0.1% by weight). At the Knapton site the combined gas flow from the well sites passes to a separator where liquids are removed. It then passes to a sulphur removal facility before being sent to the gas turbine. The removed liquids are sent to a liquids injection well which returns them to the underground reservoir. The Knapton site also has a ground flare to burn waste gases.

In 2014 Third Energy announced a joint venture with Moorland Energy Limited (MEL) to develop the Ebberston Moor South development. Gas from the existing Ebberston Moor South well will be transported via a new 14-km pipeline to the Knapton Generating Station.

Ryedale gas fields
Gas is located in North Yorkshire as part of the Southern North Sea Gas Basin. The gas fields and power station were bought by UK Energy Systems Ltd for $70 million from Viking UK Gas Ltd (owned by Viking Petroleum of Houston) who owned the fields since December 2003 and this company is still based in East Knapton as part of the acquisition. The fields were previously (since 1999) owned 60% by Tullow Oil (who sold their stake for $8.3 million in October 2003) and 40% by Edinburgh Oil & Gas plc (who sold their stake for £3.2 million). The fields were bought by Kelt UK Ltd (owned by Kelt Energy plc and Edinburgh Oil & Gas plc) from Candecca Resources Ltd (owned by BP) in 1992.

At the start of the so-called North Yorkshire Power Project in the early 1990s, the gas fields were licensed by KeltPower who persuaded Scottish Power to build the power station as due to the gas being very local, no expensive compressors for gas pipelines would be needed. Scottish Power bought gas from the fields at a price in the power station contract that was much lower (almost half) than that which the price of gas subsequently became. Gas from each gas field is pumped to the power station at East Knapton via a six-inch pipe.

Kirby Misperton
This is at Kirby Misperton near the Flamingo Land Resort. The gas field was discovered in January 1985 and production started in March 1995. This site has three wells designated KM1 and KM3 (near Kirby Misperton) and KM2 (near Little Barugh). Gas is received from the Malton site and the combined gas flow is piped to the Marishes site.

Malton
It was discovered in January 1985 with production starting in September 1995. The site has two wells designated M1 and M4, both near Great Habton. Gas is piped to the Kirby Misperton site.

The Malton gas field was originally discovered in 1970.

Marishes
This is near High Marishes and Low Marishes near the confluence of the River Derwent and the River Rye, just north of East Knapton. This field was discovered in November 1988. Production started in April 1995. The site has one well designated MAR1.  Gas is received from the Kirby Misperton site and the combined gas flow is piped to the Knapton generating station site. The site is subject to flooding when river levels are high.

Pickering
This field was discovered in January 1992 with production starting in November 2001. Other gas fields around Pickering were initially developed by Home Oil of Calgary, Alberta, Canada in the 1970s. A natural gas processing facility was formerly (1969–74) located in Pickering to treat gas from the Lockton natural gas field under the North York Moors National Park.

References

External links

 US Energy Systems

Villages in North Yorkshire
Natural gas-fired power stations in England
Natural gas fields in the United Kingdom